= Melaenae (Thera) =

Ancient town on the island of Thera

Melaenae or Melainai (Ancient Greek: Μέλαιναι) was an ancient town on the island of Thera. It is mentioned in ancient inscriptions.

Its site is unlocated.
